Dushan may refer to:

Dušan, or Dushan, a Slavic name
Dushan (Ramayana), a demon character in Indian epic Ramayana.
Dushan, Kerman, Iran, a village in Kerman Province, Iran
Dushan, Kurdistan, Iran, a village in Kurdistan Province, Iran

China
Dushan County (独山县), Guizhou
Mount Du (独山), near Nanyang, Henan
Dushan Lake (独山湖), part of Nansi Lake in Shandong
Towns
Dushan, Echeng District (杜山镇), in Echeng District, Ezhou, Hubei
Written as "独山镇":
Dushan, Lu'an, in Yu'an District, Lu'an, Anhui
Dushan, Huangmei County, Hubei
Dushan, Shandong, in Juye County

Township(s)
Dushan Township (独山乡), Lai'an County, Anhui